Tapiwa Gadibolae (born 26 February 1993) is a Motswana footballer who plays for Township Rollers F.C.

International career

International goals
Scores and results list Botswana's goal tally first.

References

External links 
 

1993 births
Living people
Botswana footballers
Botswana international footballers
Township Rollers F.C. players
Association football defenders